Giovanni and Gregorio De' Gregori ( & ) were two Italian brothers from Forlì who worked as printers in Renaissance Venice. They are generally credited with the first attractive type in nonpareil size for a 1498 or 1501 edition of the divine offices.

Gregorio di Gregorii is considered to have published the first book printed in Arabic, Kitab salat al-sawai—a book of hours—in 1514.

References

See also
 "Giovanni e Gregorio DE GREGORI" at Treccani 

People from Forlì
Italian printers